This is a list of streaming media systems. A more detailed comparison of streaming media systems is also available.

Servers 
Ampache – GPL/LGPL Audio streaming
atmosph3re – responsive web-based streaming audio server for personal music collection
Darwin Streaming Server – Apple Public Source License
datarhei Restreamer— Apache licensed media server for RTMP, HLS, and SRT with flexible FFmpeg API and graphical user interface
dyne:bolic – Linux live CD ready for radio streaming
emby – a media server/client that runs on Linux/Mac/Windows/freeBSD/docker & NAS devices with clients on Android TV/fireTV/Apple TV/Roku/Windows/PlayStation/Xbox/iOS & HTML5 Capable devices
 FFserver included in FFmpeg (discontinued)
Firefly Media Server – GPL
Flash Media Server
FreeJ – video streamer for Icecast – GPL
Helix Universal Server – delivers MPEG-DASH, RTSP, HTTP Live Streaming (HLS), RTMP; developed by RealNetworks, discontinued since October 2014
HelixCommunity – RealNetworks Open Source development community
Jellyfin – GPL-licensed fully open-source fork of Emby
Icecast – GPL streaming media server
IIS Media Services – Extensions for the Windows IIS web server that deliver intelligent progressive downloads, Smooth Streaming, and HTTP Live Streaming
Kaltura – full-featured Affero GPL video platform running on your own servers or cloud
LIVE555 – a set of open source (LGPL) C++ libraries for multimedia streaming; its RTSP/RTP/RTCP client implementation is used by VLC media player and MPlayer
Logitech Media Server – open source music streaming server, backboned by a music database (formerly SlimServer, SqueezeCenter and Squeezebox Server)
Nimble Streamer – freeware server for live and VOD streaming (transcoding function is not free)
nginx with Nginx-rtmp-module (BSD 2-clause)
OpenBroadcaster – LPFM IPTV broadcast automation tools with AGPL Linux Python play out based on Gstreamer
Open Broadcaster Software – open source streaming and recording program for Windows, Linux and OS X, maintained by the OBS Project
PlayOn – a media server that runs on a PC and supports Netflix streaming
Plex – a media server/client that runs on Linux/Mac/Windows with clients on iOS/Android/Windows/Mac/Linux
PS3 Media Server – GPLv2e media server for streaming to a PlayStation 3
Red5 – Apache licensed media server for RTMP and HLS
Rocket Streaming Audio Server (RSAS) - Audio-focused live streaming server for Windows, Linux, and FreeBSD.
QuickTime Broadcaster – Free on OS X
Sirannon – a GPL, C++ media server and client
SHOUTcast – audio streaming (HTTP and/or multicast)
SoundBridge
Starlight Networks – StarWorks and StarLive, early commercial Streaming products
TVersity Media Server – partially open source, web-based media server
Unreal Media Server – multi-protocol media server for streaming any file format and real time live audio/video to WebRTC, Flash, Silverlight, iOS, STB, HTML5 viewers
VideoLAN – GPL
Vidiator – Xenon Streaming Server
VMix – a software switcher, recorder and live streaming program for Windows, developed by Studio Coast PTY LTD
WebORB Integration Server
Windows Media Encoder
Windows Media Services
Wowza Streaming Engine – a media server for Flash, Silverlight, Apple iOS (iPhone/iPad), QuickTime, 3GPP mobile, IPTV and game console video/audio streaming

P2P 
Peer-to-peer video streaming solutions:
 WebRTC

Multicast

Services 

 8tracks
 AbemaTV
 AccuRadio
 Amazon Music
 Amazon Prime Video
 Anghami
 Apple Music
 Apple TV
 Apple TV+
 Aupeo
 Azteca Now
 Beats Music
 BET+
 Blim TV
 Bollywood hungama
 BroadwayHD
 Crackle
 Crunchyroll
 Current
 Curiosity Stream
 CW Seed
 DAZN
 DC Universe (Formerly streamed shows; now only offers unlimited comic subscription service as DC Universe Infinite)
 Deezer
 Discovery+
 Disney+
 eMusic
 Eros Now
 ESPN+
 Facebook Watch
 FilmStruck – (defunct November 29, 2018)
 Funimation Channel
 Gaana
 Globoplay
 gogoyoko
 Google Play Music – (discontinued December 3, 2020)
 Google TV
 Groove Music – (discontinued December 31, 2017)
 Grooveshark – (defunct April 30, 2015)
 Guvera
 Hayu
 HBO Go – (defunct in U.S. July 31, 2020; still available in other countries)
 HBO Max
 HBO Now – (partially defunct)
 Hidive
 Hotstar
 Hulu
 iHeartRadio
 iLike
 Jango
 JioSaavn
 Justin.tv – Allows users to produce and watch live streaming video. (defunct August 5, 2014 as it became Twitch)
 Kocowa
 Last.fm – Internet radio and music community website
 Line Music
 Live365 – Streaming media library (Defunct January 31, 2016, relaunched under new ownership with reduced availability 2017)
 MediaCore – Video learning platform
 Medici.tv – Classical music video streaming
 MeeMix
 MetaCDN – Live video streaming platform
 mog
 Mofibo – Audio & Ebook streaming
 Movies Anywhere
 Murfie – Storage and streaming of CDs, vinyl, and cassettes
 Musicovery
 MX Player
 My5
 MySpace
 NBC Sports Gold
 Netflix
 Noggin
 Pandora Radio
 Paramount+
 Peacock
 Play.it
 Playlist.com
 Pluto TV
 Qik
 Quibi – (defunct December 1, 2020)
 Radiolicious – Internet radio
 Radionomy
 Raditaz
 Radio.com
 Rdio – (defunct December 22, 2015)
 Rooster Teeth First
 Seeso (defunct November 8, 2017)
 ShemarooMe
 Side+
 SiriusXM – Internet Radio, MySXM
 Sling TV
 Songza
 SonyLIV
 SoundCloud
 Spotify – Free and paid streaming music service (browser, client and mobile applications)
 Star+
 Stitcher Radio
 Sun NXT
 TIDAL
TVING - a South Korean internet streaming service
 Triton Digital
 Tubi
 TuneIn
 Ustream.tv
 Vidio
 Vimeo
 Voot
 VRV
 Vudu
 VyRT
 Wakanim
 we7
 Wuala – Free online storage with streaming capability
 Wynk
 Xumo
 YouTube/YouTube Premium
 YouTube Music
 YuppTV
 ZEE5

Clients 
 Amarok
 Banshee
 Bitmovin's bitdash player
 Clementine (forked from Amarok 1.4)
 Kodi (formerly XBMC), a free and open source media center software and framework platform
 MediaMonkey
 MPlayer
 Rhythmbox
Roku
 Streamripper
 Total Recorder
 Totem
 VLC media player
 Winamp a freeware media player for Microsoft Windows.
 XMMS
 Zinf

See also 
 Comparison of music hosting services
 Comparison of video hosting services
 List of Internet radio stations
 List of online music databases
 List of online video platforms

References 

Streaming media systems
Internet broadcasting
Internet radio